Mariya Nzigiyimana (born c. 1934) is a Burundian midwife and Quaker. She was married to the teacher and activist Abel Binyoni.

Life
Mariya Nzigiyimana was born in Kibimba, Burundi. She was the first girl in central Burundi to complete primary education. After she trained as a midwife, she was the first woman in central Burundi to work professionally. In 1960 she married the Quaker teacher and activist Abel Binyoni, continuing to work as a midwife. In 1968 she became presiding clerk of the Women of the Friends Church, the women's meeting of Burundi Yearly Meeting.

References

1934 births
Year of birth uncertain
Living people
Midwives
Quakers
Burundian women